Douglas John Gibson (born September 28, 1953) is a Canadian former professional ice hockey player.

Early life 
Gibson was born in Peterborough, Ontario.

Career 
Selected in 1973 by the Boston Bruins of the National Hockey League and the Los Angeles Sharks of the World Hockey Association, Gibson spent most of his first two professional seasons in the Bruins' minor-league hockey system. In the 1975–76 season, he played with the Bruins, and scored his first NHL goal on November 25 in a 4-2 Boston home victory over Los Angeles. Gibson returned to the minors in the following season. After Boston waived Gibson in 1977, he played briefly for the Washington Capitals. While in the Washington organization, Gibson played with the Hershey Bears where he assumed the player-coach role and led the team to a Calder Cup Championship taking the title in 1979-80. He holds the distinction of never having spent any time in the penalty box, in his 63 NHL games played.

After retiring, Gibson worked an amateur scout for the New York Islanders and a professional scout with the Montreal Canadiens.

Career statistics

External links

Profile at hockeydraftcentral.com

1953 births
Living people
Boston Braves (AHL) players
Boston Bruins draft picks
Boston Bruins players
Canadian ice hockey centres
Hershey Bears coaches
Hershey Bears players
Ice hockey people from Ontario
Los Angeles Sharks draft picks
Montreal Canadiens scouts
New York Islanders scouts
Peterborough Petes (ice hockey) players
SC Riessersee players
Rochester Americans players
Sportspeople from Peterborough, Ontario
VEU Feldkirch players
Washington Capitals players
Canadian ice hockey coaches